Peta Anne Merrilees (born 25 October 1982) is a former Australian cricketer who is a wicket-keeper and right-handed batter. Between 2000–01 and 2010–11 of the Women's National Cricket League (WNCL), she represented Western Australia in 61 List A matches, eventually becoming captain of the side in 2009. During her time in the WNCL, she took 14 catches and three stumpings from behind the wicket and scored a total of 806 runs with the bat.

Merrilees was born in Midland, a suburb of Perth, Western Australia.

References

External links
 
 

1982 births
Living people
Australian cricketers
Australian women cricketers
Cricketers from Perth, Western Australia
Sportswomen from Western Australia
Western Australia women cricketers
Wicket-keepers